Clarke Stadium is a multipurpose facility located in Edmonton, Alberta, Canada. The stadium was originally used for Canadian football. Over the years different sports have participated at the site. Presently, it is the home of the Edmonton Huskies and the Edmonton Wildcats of the Canadian Junior Football League.

History
The stadium was originally built in 1938 and named for then-Mayor Joseph Clarke. It was built on land deeded to the city for the purpose of constructing public sports fields by the federal government (Prime Minister Mackenzie King was a personal friend of Clarke). The original Clarke Stadium accommodated approximately 20,000 fans in the spartan conditions consistent with its era. The seating area consisted of two grandstands on opposing sidelines. Some end-zone stands were added years later. The stadium hosted the Edmonton Eskimos (now Elks) of the Western Interprovincial Football Union/Canadian Football League from 1949 to 1978, following which the team moved to Commonwealth Stadium, which had been built adjacent to Clarke Stadium in preparation for the 1978 Commonwealth Games. Clarke Stadium was used for local and minor league sporting events after the departure of the football team.

Remodelling
The facility was almost completely demolished on June 1, 2000, and rebuilt as a 'secondary' stadium for events of the 2001 World Championships in Athletics hosted in Edmonton.  It was redesigned with approximately 1,200 seats in a single grandstand.  The original grass playing surface was also replaced with artificial turf to allow for greater usage as part of the facility upgrade. The stadium is currently used for university, minor and intramural sports. Clarke Park, as the remodelled stadium is often known, is also used for concerts and other events.  Including the playing surface, the capacity of the stadium grounds can exceed 6,000 for concerts and non-sporting events.

Soccer
The Edmonton Drillers of the 1970s and the Edmonton Aviators of 2004 both attempted to draw crowds to the much larger Commonwealth Stadium before moving to Clarke Stadium when they were unable to fill Commonwealth or turn a profit.  In both cases, the move to Clarke Stadium was followed closely by the team folding.

The Edmonton Brick Men of the 1980s and 90s also played at the stadium but played most matches at John Ducey Park, which was primarily a baseball diamond.

FC Edmonton began playing their North American Soccer League home games at Clarke Stadium with the 2012 season. In May 2013, construction was completed to expand the stadium's capacity to 5,000, using temporary seating. In August 2013, NASL Commissioner Bill Peterson and representatives of FC Edmonton met with officials of the City of Edmonton to discuss the installation of artificial turf, as the final step in converting the facility into a more soccer-specific stadium, while still allowing for other use. The conversion of the turf was completed in time for the 2014 season. The stadium was further renovated in advance of the 2019 CPL season, with seating increased to 5,148 and the block of temporary stands from 2013 removed in favor of permanent seating, with stands now added behind both goals along with pitch side tables beside both teams dugouts.

See also
 List of Canadian Premier League stadiums

References

External links
  Photos of Clarke Stadium
  Joe Clarke & Edmonton Stadium

c
North American Soccer League stadiums
Sports venues in Edmonton
Canadian Football League venues
Canadian Premier League stadiums
Athletics (track and field) venues in Canada
Soccer venues in Alberta
North American Soccer League (1968–1984) stadiums
Sports venues completed in 1938
1938 establishments in Alberta